Mehmandar-e Sofla (also Romanized as Mehmāndār-e Soflá; also known as Mehmāndār-e Pā’īn) is a village in Gavdul-e Markazi Rural District, in the Central District of Malekan County, East Azerbaijan Province, Iran. At the 2006 census, its population was 940, in 201 families.

References 

Populated places in Malekan County